Fregella may refer to:

 Fregella (genus), a genus of moths
 Fregellae, an ancient Italian city razed by the Romans after a revolt in 125 BC